The Dressed to Kill Tour was the sixth solo concert tour by American singer-actress Cher. Launched in support of her twenty-fifth studio album, Closer to the Truth (2013), it started in Phoenix, Arizona on March 22, 2014 and continued across North America before coming to a close in San Diego on July 11, 2014. The tour has received mostly positive reception from critics, who praised Cher's vocal performance as well as the several costumes and show elements.

Pat Benatar and Neil Giraldo were listed as "special guests" for the first 13 dates from March 22, 2014 to April 12, 2014 and Cyndi Lauper for the further 36 shows from April 23, 2014 through July 11, 2014. On November 21, 2014, after numerous delays in the planned launch of the second leg of the tour, Cher announced that she had prematurely aborted the tour due to health problems. Even with the cancellation of the 2nd leg, the tour made its way onto the Pollstars Top 20 Worldwide Tours of 2014 list, ranking at number 19 with the gross of $55 million and more than 600,000 tickets sold.

Background and development 
On September 23, 2013, Cher visited The Today Show aired on NBC where she performed "Woman's World", "I Hope You Find It" and "Believe". While on the show, Cher announced that she would tour with her twenty-fifth album, Closer to the Truth. When speaking about the tour, Cher stated:
"Being on the road is horrible but the concerts are great. I can understand why bands tear up hotel rooms – it can be a very lonely place – but the only time you have fun is at the concerts."

After the appearance, it was announced through Cher's website that American Express cardmembers would have the first chance to purchase the tickets during the tour pre-sale from September 30, 2013 to October 3, 2013. Tickets that were purchased online included a physical copy of Closer to the Truth.

On May 14, 2014, Cher revealed on The Today Show that the tour would be extended with 27 additional dates across North America, beginning on September 11, 2014. For that second leg, fashion designer and long-time collaborator Bob Mackie had provided a string of new costumes for Cher. He was unable to make a commitment in the first place, and was thus replaced by Hugh Durrant for the first leg.

After several postponements starting shortly before the originally planned launch in September, the second leg of the tour ultimately got cancelled on November 21, 2014; due to Cher recovering from an acute viral infection which affected her kidney function. In an official statement, she indicated to be "devastated," adding she "sincerely hope[s] that we can come back again next year and finish what we started."

Concert synopsis 

The show began with Cher atop a pedestal in a glittering gown and feathered headdress singing "Woman's World" surrounded by dancers and backing vocalists; a gladiator-themed performance of "Strong Enough" followed. After she welcomes the audience to the show, a vampire-themed performance of "Dressed to Kill" came next, ending with Cher biting dancer Joe Slaughter's neck. An interlude plays and Cher returns to sing "The Beat Goes On" and "I Got You Babe", the latter with footage of her late-husband Sonny Bono appearing on the video screens behind her.

The third segment saw Cher's dancers paraded around the main floor as she sang "Gypsys, Tramps & Thieves" and "Dark Lady" before donning an floor-length Native American headdress to sing "Half-Breed." After a brief interlude featuring clips from Cher's films, the singer then paid tribute to her appearance in Burlesque with "Welcome to Burlesque" and "You Haven't Seen the Last of Me."

The fifth act began with a performance of "Take It Like a Man", where Cher emerged from atop a gilded Trojan horse wearing a Helen of Troy-inspired gladiator outfit alongside her dancers. She then dedicated her cover of Marc Cohn's "Walking in Memphis" to the moment when she and her mother saw Elvis Presley live in concert. Cher followed the performance with the hits "Just Like Jesse James", "Heart of Stone" and "The Shoop Shoop Song (It's in His Kiss)".

The final act had Cher changing into her famous black see-through bodysuit to perform "I Found Someone" and "If I Could Turn Back Time". She closed the main set with "Believe", after changing in a jeweled bodysuit, like the one from her Vegas residency show. She then exited for a final costume change, and returned to close the concert with "I Hope You Find It" as she was raised up on a platform and flown above the audience amid sparkling lights.

Critical reception 

Joey Guerra from the Houston Chronicle gave a positive review from her performance in Houston, writing: "There's no one quite like Cher. And there's nothing quite as spectacular as a Cher show." Tiney Ricciardi from the Dallas Morning News praised her performance in Dallas, writing that the singer "wowed the audience with exact vocal execution" and "looked fabulous doing it." Eva Raggio from the Dallas Observer also acclaimed the show in Dallas, writing Cher "brought Vegas to Dallas and delivered the greatest spectacle of the year." Jerry Wofford from the Tulsa World was impressed with the show, commenting on the singer's humor and vocal power, writing: "She was carefree and irreverent and hilarious." Dave McKenna from The Washington Post called the performance in Washington D.C. "outrageous" and "gutsy", while noting there were "plenty of nods to the old days." Ben Rayer writing for The Star gave the singer's performance in Toronto three out of four stars, writing that "the 67-year old's performance sent tidal waves of elation through the arena." James Reed from The Boston Globe praised her performance at the TD Garden, writing the singer was "in exceptional form, as a singer and entertainer." Chris Azzopardi writing for Between the Lines gave a positive review at the performance in Detroit, calling the show "jaw-dropping, frilly, and elaborately produced." Jeff Miers from The Buffalo News wrote her performance in Buffalo offered a "visceral thrill, one that everyone appeared to be willing to indulge in." Tony Lofaro from the Ottawa Citizen praised the concert in Ottawa writing Cher is "a pop diva supreme with timeless quality and an over-worked Vegas patter with just enough titillating sexiness to send everybody home giddy."

A.D. Amorosi from Philly.com wrote that the singer's voice in Philadelphia was "delicious, filled with deep, long vowels, even when iced-over by Auto-Tune robotics." Laura DeMarco writing for The Plain Dealer commented on her performance in Cleveland, writing Cher "did not disappoint on her aptly dubbed tour" and the show was "full-on entertainment, from the fashion to the sounds of the set." Jim Farber from the New York Daily News wrote her joyful performance in New York City "came from its mission to defy common notions of taste, age and even self-parody." Melissa Ruggieri from Access Atlanta gave a positive review of the performance in Atlanta calling the singer "irreplaceable" and writing Cher's shows are "spectacles that are embellished to the point of excess." Jim Abbott from the Orlando Sentinel noted there was "plenty of heart in Cher's spectacle" and "enough humor and shoot-from-the-hip candor to humanize the flashy excesses." Timothy Finn from the Kansas City Star wrote the singer "justified her eminence" with a performance "that showcased her career in music, television and film and showed off her physical endurance, which is still impressive, especially for a 68-year-old." Francois Marchand from the Vancouver Sun wrote the show was "an elaborate display that took fans on an aural and visual trip down memory lane," and adding it "was eye candy and glitter galore throughout." Mikael Wood writing for the Los Angeles Times praised the performance at Staples Center writing the concert felt "reassuringly human, even low-key at points."

Commercial performance 
On May 29, 2014 it was reported by Billboard that the Dressed to Kill Tour had claimed the No. 1 spot on their weekly ranking of Hot Tours with more than $15.5 million in revenue. From April 23 through May 17, 2014, Cher sold 177,239 tickets, each show during that period being a sell-out. Since the tour's launch on March 22, 2014, a total of 340,000 tickets with a gross of over $30 million had been sold through the show on May 17. The Izod Center in New Jersey had drawn the largest crowd with 14,893 people in attendance. Toronto's Air Canada Centre held the record of highest sales total since the beginning of the tour, with $1.7 million in revenue from an April 7, 2014 performance.

The first leg of the tour, which spanned 49 dates across North America, grossed a total of $55.1 Million, as reported by Billboard on July 15, 2014. One of the most lucrative concert tours of 2014, it has been attended by 610,413 people so far. The MGM Grand Garden Arena in Las Vegas produced the largest gross of the first leg, earning $1.75 Million via a concert on May 25.

On Pollstars Mid Year Top 100 Worldwide Tours list, released in July 2014 and ranking tours up until that date, the "Dressed to Kill" tour was ranked at number 9 with $48.5 million in grosses and 538,707 tickets sold. On Pollstars Top 20 Worldwide Tours of 2014 list, the "Dressed to Kill" tour was ranked at number 19 with $54.8 million in grosses and 608,435 tickets sold.

Set list 
This set list is representative of the performance in Kansas City. It does not represent all concerts for the duration of the tour.

"Woman's World"
"Strong Enough"
"Dressed to Kill"
"The Beat Goes On"
"I Got You Babe"
"Gypsys, Tramps & Thieves"
"Dark Lady"
"Half-Breed"
"Welcome to Burlesque"
"You Haven't Seen the Last of Me"
"Take It Like a Man"
"Walking in Memphis"
"Just Like Jesse James"
"I Found Someone"
"If I Could Turn Back Time"
"Believe"

Encore
"I Hope You Find It"

Shows

Cancelled shows

Personnel 
Band
Musical Directors: Ollie Marland and Paul Mirkovich
Guitar: David Barry 
Bass Guitar: Eva Gardner
Keyboards: Ollie Marland and Darrell Smith
Drums: Mark Schulman
Backing Vocalists: Stacy Campbell and Nikki Tillman
Dancers: Jackie Dowsett Ballinger, Sagiv Ben Binyamin, Suzanne Easter, Emilie Livingston, Tyne Stecklein, Sumayah McRae, Marlon Pelayo, Ryan Ramirez, Joe Slaughter, Jamal Story, Maximiliano Torandell, Jaymz Tuaileva and Kevin Wilson

Notes

References

External links
Dressed To Kill Tour web site

Cher concert tours
2014 concert tours